Antonio Cardore (born 18 January 1996) is an Italian football player who plays for Serie D club Cassino.

Club career
He made his Serie B debut for Juve Stabia on 26 April 2014 in a game against Trapani.

On 22 July 2017 he signed a 2-years deal for Lucchese.

On 30 January 2019 he was released from his contract with Lucchese by mutual consent. After a spell at Sorrento from January to July 2019 and a spell at US Levico Terme for the 2019-20 season, Cardore moved to A.C. Bra in the summer 2020. In February 2021, he joined Derthona. On 30 July 2021, Cardore moved to Gelbison.

References

External links
 
 

1996 births
Footballers from Naples
Living people
Italian footballers
Association football midfielders
S.S. Juve Stabia players
Virtus Entella players
A.S. Martina Franca 1947 players
U.S. Viterbese 1908 players
S.S.D. Lucchese 1905 players
A.C. Bra players
A.S.D. HSL Derthona players
A.S.D. Cassino Calcio 1924 players
Serie B players
Serie C players
Serie D players